Andrew Donaldson may refer to:
 Andrew Donaldson (footballer, born 1884) (1884–?), Scottish footballer
 Andy Donaldson (1925–1987), English footballer
 Andrew Brown Donaldson (died 1919), British artist